Guyjeh Qamalaq (also Romanized as Gūyjeh Qamalāq; also known as Gowjeh Qamalāq and Gūyjeh Qamlān) is a village in Quri Chay-ye Gharbi Rural District, Saraju District, Maragheh County, East Azerbaijan Province, Iran. At the 2006 census, its population was 256, in 51 families.

References 

Towns and villages in Maragheh County